.kr is the Internet country code top-level domain (ccTLD) for the Republic of Korea (South Korea). Registrations are processed via registration agents.

From September 2006, it became possible to register domain names directly under .kr (although this is currently only possible for internationalized domain names). Trademark holders and public bodies benefited from an "early registration period", after which the owners of .kr third-level domains had priority to get the corresponding second-level domains.

1. Sunrise I (18 September–20 November 2006)
 Governmental Bodies only
2. Sunrise II (21 November 2006–27 February 2007)
 A holder of 3rd level .kr domain
 The registered 3rd level domain and the 3rd level domain should be registered before 13 March 2006
 The full name of registered trademark using same alphabetical order 
3. Landrush (28 March–11 April 2007)
 Anyone or any business entity who has an address in the territory
4. General Registration (from 19 April 2007)
 First-come first-served basis

In 2011 a new top-level domain was registered for South Korea, intended for domain names in the local language. The top-level domain is  domain names and working sites became active during 2011.

Domains and subdomains

Defunct domains and subdomains

Domain hacks
.kr domains are sometimes used as domain hacks such as flic.kr, an alternative address for Flickr.

New generic top level domains (new gTLDs) registered by South Korean organizations or individuals
 .doosan: A new brand gTLD for the Doosan Group.
 .hyundai: A new brand gTLD for the Hyundai Motor Group.
 .kia: A new brand gTLD for Kia Motors.
 .samsung: A new brand gTLD for the Samsung Group.
 .lotte: A new brand gTLD for the Lotte Group.
 . (.xn--t60b56a; .dat-net): A new technology gTLD. Korean Hangul transliteration of English "dotnet."
 . (.xn--mk1bu44c; .dat-keom): A new technology gTLD. Korean Hangul transliteration of English "dotcom."
 . (.xn--cg4bki; .Samseong): A new brand gTLD for the Samsung Group.

See also
 .kp: The top-level domain for the Democratic People's Republic of Korea (North Korea)
 Communications in South Korea

Footnotes

References

External links
 KRNIC
 Delegation Record for .KR - IANA
 Whois Search (in English) - KISA
 Whois Search (in Korean) - KISA 

Country code top-level domains
Internet in South Korea

sv:Toppdomän#K